Anthony Winbush (born December 18, 1994) is a former American football defensive end. He played college football at Ball State.

Professional career

Atlanta Falcons
Winbush signed with the Atlanta Falcons as an undrafted free agent on May 1, 2018. He was waived on September 1, 2018.

Indianapolis Colts
On November 13, 2018, Winbush was signed to the Indianapolis Colts practice squad. He spent time on and off the Colts practice squad before being released on January 3, 2019. He was re-signed on January 9, 2019. He signed a reserve/future contract on January 13, 2019. He was waived on May 5, 2019.

References

External links
Ball State Cardinals bio

1994 births
Living people
American football linebackers
Atlanta Falcons players
Ball State Cardinals football players
Indianapolis Colts players
Players of American football from Indianapolis